Adore is the third extended play (EP) and debut major-label release by English singer and songwriter Jasmine Thompson. It was released on 18 September 2015 by Atlantic Records. Adore serves as Thompson's first release after signing to the label earlier that year.

Background
In an interview with The Huffington Posts Mike Ragogna, Thompson stated that most of the songs on the EP have a love theme, along with topics of trust and not being afraid of failure.

Track listing

References

2015 EPs
Atlantic Records EPs